Diablo Lake is a reservoir in the North Cascade mountains of northern Washington state, United States. Diablo Lake is part of the Skagit River Hydroelectric Project and managed by Seattle City Light.

History
 
The Skagit Valley was formed through runoff from Cordilleran Glacier. The unique, intense turquoise hue of the lake's water is attributed to the surrounding glaciers that grind rocks into a fine powder that is carried into the lake through creeks. That fine powder, also called glacial flour, stays suspended in the lake, giving the water its brilliant color.

Diablo Dam

The Diablo Dam is a part of the Skagit River Hydroelectric Project, which is owned and operated by Seattle City Light. Construction finished in 1930 and the dam became operational in 1936.

Recreation 

Diablo Lake Trail is the main hike surrounding the lake. It is a 7.2-mile hike reaching roughly 1,512 feet in elevation and is a moderate-level hike within the Ross Lake National Recreation Area.

Fishing

The lake holds rainbow, coastal cutthroat, brook, and bull trout. Two-pole fishing is prohibited at Diablo Lake.

See also
List of dams and reservoirs in the United States#Washington

References

External links

Ross Lake National Recreation Area
Seattle City Light tours

Reservoirs in Washington (state)
Lakes of Whatcom County, Washington
North Cascades of Washington (state)
Reservoirs and dams in National Park Service units
Protected areas of Whatcom County, Washington